NewsNation may refer to:

 News Nation, the Hindi television news channel in India
 News Nation Assam
 NewsNation, an American news and entertainment television network
 NewsNation with Tamron Hall, American weekday talk-news television program that was broadcast on MSNBC between 2010 and 2017